Archibald Napier, 3rd Lord Napier (died 1683) was a Scottish peer.

Family

Archibald Napier was a member of the Napier family of Merchiston, Scotland, and was the great-grandson of John Napier, the inventor of logarithms.

He was the son of Archibald Napier, 2nd Lord Napier and Lady Elizabeth Erskine, daughter of John Erskine, 19th Earl of Mar.

Archibald died unmarried and childless, and the Lordship of Napier passed through his sister Jean to his nephew Thomas Nicolson, 4th Lord Napier, by a special arrangement of the title.

Reference

Archibald
1683 deaths
Year of birth unknown
Lords of Parliament (pre-1707)
Lords Napier
Eldest sons of British hereditary barons